The National Association of State Directors of Developmental Disabilities Services (NASDDDS) is a nonprofit organization near Washington, D.C., established in 1964, to improve and expand public services to people with intellectual and other developmental disabilities in the United States. Mary P. Sowers is the executive director.

See also 
 National Core Indicators

External links

Organizations established in 1964
Disability organizations based in the United States
Organizations based in Washington, D.C.